Scott Lowell (born February 22, 1965, in Denver, Colorado) is an American actor best known for his role as Ted Schmidt on the Showtime drama Queer as Folk.

Biography
Lowell was adopted in Denver, Colorado, and raised just outside New Haven, Connecticut. He attended Hopkins School and Connecticut College in New London, Connecticut. He moved to Chicago shortly after college to pursue acting.

Filmography

Film

Television

Theater

Conventions

References

External links

Scott Lowell Official site

1965 births
American male television actors
Connecticut College alumni
Hopkins School alumni
Living people
Male actors from Connecticut
American adoptees